The 2014–15 Bucknell Bison men's basketball team represented Bucknell University during the 2014–15 NCAA Division I men's basketball season. The Bison, led by seventh year head coach Dave Paulsen, played their home games at Sojka Pavilion and were members of the Patriot League. They finished the season 19–15, 13–5 in Patriot League play to win the Patriot League regular season championship. They advanced to the semifinals of the Patriot League tournament where they lost to Lafayette. As a regular season league champion who failed to win their league tournament, they received an automatic bid to the National Invitation Tournament where they lost in the first round to Temple.

On March 30, head coach Dave Paulson resigned to take the same position at George Mason. He finished at Bucknell with a 7-year record of 134–94.

Roster

Schedule

|-
!colspan=9 style="background:#FF5E17; color:#0041C4;"| Non-conference regular season

|-
!colspan=9 style="background:#FF5E17; color:#0041C4;"| Conference regular season

|-
!colspan=9 style="background:#FF5E17; color:#0041C4;"| Patriot League tournament

|-
!colspan=9 style="background:#FF5E17; color:#0041C4;"| NIT

References

Bucknell Bison men's basketball seasons
Bucknell
Bucknell
Bucknell Bison men's basketball team
Bucknell Bison men's basketball team